Travis Eugene Miller (born November 2, 1972) is an American former professional baseball player who pitched from – for the Minnesota Twins of Major League Baseball (MLB). He is currently the athletic director for Eaton Community Schools in Eaton, Ohio.

Miller attended National Trail High School in New Paris, Ohio, and played collegiately at Kent State University. In 1994, he was named the Mid-American Conference Baseball Pitcher of the Year.

Miller won 7 games in the majors, losing 18. On May 9, 2000, he picked up his lone major league save against the Indians. Miller came in and retired the last batter of the game to preserve a 6-5 Twins victory.

References

External links

1972 births
Living people
American expatriate baseball players in Canada
Baseball players from Dayton, Ohio
Buffalo Bisons (minor league) players
Chattanooga Lookouts players
Edmonton Trappers players
Fort Wayne Wizards players
Hardware City Rock Cats players
Indianapolis Indians players
Iowa Cubs players
Kent State Golden Flashes baseball players
Louisville Bats players
Major League Baseball pitchers
Minnesota Twins players
Nashville Xpress players
People from Eaton, Ohio
Salt Lake Buzz players